WTTE (channel 28) is a television station in Columbus, Ohio, United States, airing programming from the digital multicast network TBD. It is owned by Cunningham Broadcasting, which maintains a local marketing agreement (LMA) with Sinclair Broadcast Group, owner of ABC/MyNetworkTV/Fox affiliate WSYX (channel 6), for the provision of certain services. However, Sinclair effectively owns WTTE as the majority of Cunningham's stock is owned by the family of deceased group founder Julian Smith. Sinclair also operates Chillicothe-licensed CW affiliate WWHO (channel 53) under a separate LMA with Manhan Media. The stations share studios on Dublin Road in Grandview Heights (with a Columbus mailing address), while WTTE's transmitter is located in the Franklinton section of Columbus.

A charter Fox affiliate from the network's sign-on from 1986 to 2021, WTTE also served as the Fox station of record for the nearby Zanesville, Ohio market.

History

WTTE began operations on June 1, 1984, as the first general-entertainment independent station in central Ohio. The station was founded by the Commercial Radio Institute, a subsidiary of the Baltimore-based Sinclair Broadcast Group (at the time, called Chesapeake Broadcasting Corporation) as the company's third television station after WPTT-TV (now WPNT) in Pittsburgh and flagship station WBFF in Baltimore. Much like its sister stations signed on by Sinclair, WTTE's callsign alluded to its location and channel number ("Baltimore Forty Five" & "Pittsburgh Twenty Two"), in this case "Television Twenty Eight" (the WCTE calls meeting that naming pattern were already taken by a PBS member station in Cookeville, Tennessee). The station originally operated from studio and office facilities at 6130 South Sunbury Road in Columbus.

WTTE quickly became the dominant independent station in the area largely because its programming policy was far less conservative than that of the other independent in the area, Christian-oriented, WSFJ-TV (channel 51). Channel 28 was a charter affiliate of Fox, having joined the network at its launch on October 9, 1986 alongside sister station WBFF. (WPTT remained independent due to the higher-rated WPGH-TV picking up the Fox affiliation in Pittsburgh; Sinclair would acquire that station in 1990.) From 1995 until 1997, WTTE also carried a secondary affiliation with UPN which was then picked up by WWHO. Early in that run, the station listed both affiliations on an equal level (as "the best of both worlds") in its station identifications of the time, including a period where Fox logos were dropped entirely.

Merger with WSYX
In 1996, Sinclair merged with River City Broadcasting, owner of WSYX. Federal Communications Commission (FCC) rules at the time did not allow one person to own two stations in a single market. Sinclair kept the longer-established WSYX and nominally sold WTTE to Glencairn, Ltd. owned by former Sinclair executive Edwin Edwards. However, nearly all of Glencairn's stock was held by the Smith family, founders and owners of Sinclair. In effect, Sinclair still owned WTTE, and now had a duopoly in Columbus in violation of FCC rules. Sinclair and Glencairn further circumvented the rules by moving WTTE's operations into WSYX's Dublin Road studios under a local marketing agreement, with WSYX as senior partner. Glencairn owned ten other stations—all in markets where Sinclair also had a station. Sinclair was eventually fined $40,000 for its illegal control of Glencairn. The two companies attempted to merge in 2001 after the FCC allowed duopolies. However, the FCC would not allow Sinclair to repurchase WTTE. The FCC does not allow duopolies between two of the four highest-rated stations in a single market. Also the Columbus market, despite its relatively large size, has only seven full-power stations—too few to legally permit a duopoly. WTTE thus remained under the banner of Glencairn, which was then renamed Cunningham Broadcasting. However, the Smith family still controls nearly all of Cunningham's stock, so Sinclair still effectively had a duopoly in Columbus. By nearly all accounts, Sinclair has used Glencairn/Cunningham as a shell corporation to evade FCC ownership rules.

In 2000, WWHO switched its affiliation to UPN, but signed a deal with The WB to retain its programming on a secondary basis through what a Paramount Stations Group executive described as a "program license agreement." As a result, WTTE picked up half of Kids' WB!'s weekday programming and aired it alongside its usual Fox Kids programming. This arrangement continued until 2001.

In 2006, all Sinclair-controlled Fox affiliates including WTTE extended their affiliation contracts until at least March 2012. WTTE-DT2 was formerly an affiliate of The Tube, a 24-hour digital music channel. Like other Sinclair-owned stations, this was dropped in January 2007, due to a disagreement between Sinclair and The Tube over E/I programming. The network ceased operations that October due to the lack of advertising.

According to Nielsen Media Research in the May 2011 ratings period, WTTE was the second most watched Fox affiliate in the United States in prime time.  The station remained intensely competitive in the Columbus television market with it remaining an extremely strong competitor against WBNS-TV and WCMH-TV averaging roughly 300,000 viewers each night during the station's 10 o'clock newscast despite its earlier time slot. As WTTE-DT1 or currently, WSYX-DT3, it typically wins the demographic viewership battle each and every ratings period. The demographic win is a much sought after attribute for television sales associates in the area for local advertising purposes.

On October 18, 2010, the station reactivated its 28.2 digital subchannel for the first time since December 2006, with theCoolTV, a music video network which, unlike The Tube, had E/I programming pre-inserted as part of its national schedule. The network was discontinued as of August 31, 2012.

WTTE was also considered an alternate ABC affiliate airing that network's programs when WSYX is unable to do so such as during a breaking news emergency or local special.

On May 15, 2012, Sinclair and Fox agreed to a five-year extension to the network's affiliation agreement with the 19 Fox stations owned or controlled by Sinclair, including WTTE, allowing them to continue carrying the network's programming through 2017.

On June 23, 2014, Sinclair signed a deal with Sony Pictures Entertainment to carry the GetTV network as a subchannel on 33 of its stations; WTTE was one such station, and the 28.2 subchannel was reactivated.

On June 1, 2017, Sinclair replaced GetTV with TBD on WTTE's 28.2 subchannel. TBD is operated by Sinclair Television Group, a subsidiary of Sinclair Broadcast Group.

On August 21, 2017, WTTE's 28.3 subchannel began carriage of Stadium, which replaced ASN.

Move of Fox to WSYX-DT3 and new affiliation with TBD TV
On January 1, 2021, Sinclair quietly sent a letter to cable and satellite providers saying that it had consolidated the Fox affiliations of stations in markets where it had been on a sister Cunningham or Deerfield-owned station onto Sinclair owned stations, putting those affiliations directly in Sinclair's control. While most markets transitioned on that day, the transition of WTTE-DT1's programming schedule onto WSYX's spectrum would be held off until January 7, as that would be the day WWHO would convert to being the market's ATSC 3.0 lighthouse station, and it would easier for the transition of all the channels being moved or launched to occur then.

On that day, Sinclair began simulcasting "Fox 28" programming on WSYX-DT3, while moving Antenna TV to the newly created 6.4. WTTE's main signal would eventually carry Sinclair-owned TBD full-time. The simulcast continued until February 3 at 10 a.m., when the "Fox 28" schedule was now only available through WSYX-DT3.

With the move of the "Fox 28" schedule to WSYX-DT3, it became the largest-market subchannel-only Fox affiliate, surpassing Albuquerque, New Mexico's KRQE-DT2 for that distinction, along with the largest station by market size holding two affiliations with the Big Four networks (also ahead of KRQE). The transition also meant that WTTE began to host WWHO's main ATSC 1.0 signal on its spectrum (mapping to 53.1).

The switch was contractually proper for cable and satellite providers, who continue to carry Fox programming on all of "Fox 28"'s existing low-number channel positions, while WTTE-DT1's carriage now depends on provider; some carry it as a low-number channel, while others no longer carry any of WTTE's channels.

In April 2021, Antenna TV and Stadium swapped channels, with Stadium moving to 6.4 and Antenna TV moving to WTTE-DT2.

News operation
Sinclair never launched an independent news department for WTTE prior to its acquisition of WSYX, though with WBFF and WPGH-TV in Pittsburgh launching news departments in the 1990s (WPGH-TV has since shut theirs down in favor of airing a 10 p.m. newscast from WPXI), it is likely Sinclair would have launched a news department for WTTE had it not acquired WSYX.

As a Fox affiliate, WTTE broadcast 25½ hours of locally produced newscasts each week (with four hours each weekday, three hours on Saturdays and 2½ hours on Sundays).

Technical information

Subchannels
The station's digital signal is multiplexed:

Analog-to-digital conversion
WTTE was one of only two full-power television stations in the Columbus market (the other being WWHO) that honored the original DTV transition date of February 17, 2009. The station shut down its analog signal, over UHF channel 28, at 11:59 p.m. on that date, as part of the federally mandated transition from analog to digital television. The station's digital signal remained on its pre-transition UHF channel 36, using PSIP to display WTTE's virtual channel as 28 on digital television receivers.

However, until March 3, as part of the SAFER Act, analog channel 28 aired a repeating loop of a short informational film (in both English and Spanish) about the DTV changeover and how to upgrade to digital television. Analog channel 28 has since gone dark.

See also

Channel 27 digital TV stations in the United States
Channel 28 virtual TV stations in the United States

References

External links

TBD (TV network) affiliates
Antenna TV affiliates
TTE
Sinclair Broadcast Group
Television channels and stations established in 1984
1984 establishments in Ohio